The War of the Antiochene Succession, also known as the Antiochene War of Succession, comprised a series of armed conflicts in northern Syria between 1201 and 1219, connected to the disputed succession of Bohemond III of Antioch. The Principality of Antioch was the leading Christian power in the region during the last decades of the 12th century, but Armenian Cilicia challenged its supremacy. The capture of an important fortress, Bagras, in Syria by Leo II of Cilicia gave rise to a prolonged conflict already in the early 1190s. Leo tried to capture Antioch, but the Greek and Latin burghers formed a commune and prevented the Armenian soldiers from occupying the town. Bohemond III's eldest son, Raymond, died in 1197, leaving an infant son, Raymond-Roupen. The boy's mother, Alice of Armenia, was LeoI's niece and heir presumptive. BohemondIII and the Antiochene noblemen confirmed Raymond-Roupen's right to succeed his grandfather in Antioch, but the commune preferred BohemondIII's younger son (Raymond-Roupen's uncle), Bohemond, Count of Tripoli.

Bohemond of Tripoli seized Antioch without resistance after his father died in April 1201, but many noblemen left the principality to seek refuge in Cilicia. Leo invaded the Principality of Antioch in almost every year between 1201 and 1208, but he had to return to his kingdom on each occasion because Az-Zahir Ghazi, the Ayyubid emir of Aleppo, or Kaykaus I, the Seljuq sultan of Rum stormed into Cilicia in his absence. Pope Innocent III initially supported Leo. However, the conflict between Leo and the Knights Templar over Bagras led to Leo's excommunication in 1208. During the following years, Leo captured new fortresses in Syria, abandoning them in 1213 as part of an effort to improve his relationship with the Holy See. Taking advantage of BohemondIV's isolation, Leo entered Antioch, helping Raymond-Roupen seize the principality in 1216. Before long, Leo abandoned Bagras and lost the Armenian fortresses to the north of the Taurus Mountains to the Seljuqs. Raymond-Roupen increased taxes, which made him unpopular in Antioch. His relationship with Leo also became tense, enabling BohemondIV to regain Antioch in 1219. The war contributed to the weakening of the Christian states in Northern Syria.

Background 

After Saladin, the Ayyubid sultan of Syria and Egypt, destroyed the Kingdom of Jerusalem in the late 1180s, the Principality of Antioch became the leading Christian power of Northern Syria. By 1186 Leo II, Lord of Armenian Cilicia, had already acknowledged the suzerainty of Bohemond III of Antioch, but their relationship became tense after Bohemond borrowed money from Leo but failed to repay it.

In 1191 Leo captured and rebuilt Bagras, a strategically important fortress that Saladin had seized from the Knights Templar and then destroyed before abandoning it. Bohemond ordered Leo to return it to the Templars, but Leo refused, stating that his right of recent conquest was stronger that the claim of the Templars who had lost their property. After Bohemond failed to include Cilicia in his truce with Saladin in 1192, Leo invited him to Bagras to start negotiations. Bohemond accepted the offer, but Leo had him captured, forcing him to surrender Antioch. Although the noblemen (who were closely related to Armenian nobles) were willing to accept Leo's rule, the mainly Greek and Latin townspeople formed a commune and prevented the Armenian soldiers from occupying Antioch.

Peace was restored with the mediation of Henry I of Jerusalem, who persuaded both Leo and Bohemond to renounce their claims to suzerainty over each other. Leo's occupation of Bagras was confirmed. Bohemond's eldest son, Raymond, married Leo's niece and heir presumptive, Alice. Raymond died in early 1197, but his widow give birth to a posthumous son, Raymond-Roupen. The almost sixty-year-old BohemondIII sent Alice and her son to Armenia, showing that he did not want to acknowledge his infant grandson's right to succeed him in Antioch.

Leo had meanwhile united the Armenian Church in Cilicia with Rome and acknowledged the suzerainty of the Holy Roman Emperor, Henry VI. The emperor's envoy, Conrad of Wittelsbach, Archbishop of Mainz, was present when Leo was crowned the first king of Armenian Cilicia on 6January 1198. Before long, Conrad went to Antioch and persuaded Bohemond and his barons to swear an oath to accept Raymund-Roupen's right to inherit Antioch.

Bohemond III's younger son (Raymund-Roupen's uncle), Bohemond, Count of Tripoli, disputed the validity of their oath. He expelled his father from Antioch with the support of the Templars, the Hospitallers and the commune of the burghers in late 1198. Three months later Leo invaded the Principality of Antioch, forcing the younger Bohemond to allow his father to return to Antioch. Pope Innocent III also supported the restoration of BohemondIII in Antioch, but, responding to the Templars' demand, he also began urging Leo to restore Bagras to them.

War

First phase 

When Bohemond III died in April, Bohemond of Tripoli hurried to Antioch, where, because he was the late prince's closest living relative, he was recognized by the commune of the townspeople as his father's rightful heir. The nobles who had regarded Raymond-Roupen (the only son of BohemondIII's eldest son) the lawful prince, fled to the Kingdom of Cilicia. Bohemond repaid a loan that Raymond III of Tripoli had long before borrowed from the Knights Hospitaller, thus winning them over to his side.

Leo continued to support Raymond-Roupen, which sparked an enduring conflict, with many theatres of war. During the war, neither Leo nor BohemondIV was able to control his own territory (Cilicia and Tripoli, respectively) and Antioch at the same time, due to insufficient forces. Az-Zahir Ghazi, the Ayyubid emir of Aleppo, and the Seljuq rulers of Anatolia were always ready to invade Cilicia, while the Ayyubid rulers of Hama and Homs controlled the territory between Antioch and Tripoli, hindering the movements of Bohemond's troops between the two crusader states.

Shortly after Bohemond seized Antioch, Leo laid siege to it to press Raymond-Roupen's cause, but Bohemond's allies, Az-Zahir Ghazi and Suleiman II, Seljuq Sultan of Rum, stormed into Cilicia, forcing Leo to withdraw in July 1201. He soon sent letters to Pope Innocent, informing him of Bohemond's cooperation with the Muslim rulers. Leo again invaded Antioch in 1202, but Aimery, King of Jerusalem and Cyprus, and the papal legate, Cardinal Soffredo, mediated a truce. After BohemondIV refused to acknowledge the right of the Holy See to pass judgement in the case of the succession of Antioch, Leo renewed the war. Taking advantage of Bohemond's absence, Leo entered Antioch on 11November 1203, but he was not able to seize the citadel, which was defended by the Templars and the troops of the commune. Before long, Az-Zahir Ghazi again invaded Cilicia, forcing Leo to return to his kingdom.

Renoart of Nephin, who had married an heiress in the County of Tripoli without Bohemond's consent, rose up against Bohemond in late 1204. He routed Bohemond at the gates of Tripoli. Leo seized the Antiochene fortresses in the Amanus Mountains, which controlled the road towards Antioch. He laid siege to the fortress at Trapessac on 25December 1205, but Az-Zahir Ghazi's troops routed his army. After crushing Renoart of Nephin's revolt, Bohemond returned to Antioch, forcing Leo to sign a truce for eight years in summer 1206.

Conflicts with the Church 

A conflict between the new papal legate, Peter of Capua, and the Latin Patriarch of Antioch, Peter of Angoulême, who had become Raymond-Roupen's supporter, ended with the excommunication of the patriarch. Exploiting the situation to get rid of his opponent, Bohemond replaced Peter of Angoulême with the Greek Orthodox Patriarch of Antioch, SymeonII with the support of the commune in early 1207. Peter of Angoulême was reconciled with the legate, excommunicated Bohemond and the commune, and then persuaded some nobles to rise up against Bohemond, forcing him to take refuge in the citadel. Leo entered Antioch, but Bohemond collected his forces and defeated the Armenians. Peter of Angoulême was captured and died of drink deprivation in his prison.

The Ayyubid sultan, Al-Adil I, stormed into the County of Tripoli, creating an opportunity for Leo to plunder the land around Antioch in 1208. Bohemond persuaded Kaykaus I, Sultan of Rum, to invade Cilicia, forcing Leo to withdraw from Antioch. Pope Innocent tasked Albert Avogadro, Patriarch of Jerusalem, to mediate a peace. Avogadro, who was an ally of the Knights Templar, urged Leo to return Bagras to them. In an attempt to renew the truce, Leo obeyed the legate's demand, promising to withdraw from Bagras.

Before long, Leo broke his promise and refused to return Bagras to the Templars. He also decided to terminate the union of the Armenian Church with Rome. On the other hand, he granted fortresses to the Teutonic Knights in Cilicia. He also arranged the marriage of Raymond-Roupen with Helvis, sister of Hugh I of Cyprus. Leo ambushed a caravan which had been transporting provisions to the Templars in 1211. In the skirmish, Guillaume de Chartres, Grand Master of the Knights Templar, was badly injured. News of Leo's action shocked Pope Innocent, who forbade all Christian rulers to assist Leo and urged John of Brienne, King of Jerusalem, to intervene on the Templars' behalf. John sent fifty knights to Northern Syria to fight against Leo. Leo expelled the Latin priests from Cilicia and gave shelter to the Orthodox Patriarch, Symenon, who had been driven out of Antioch. He dispatched Raymond-Roupen to plunder the region of Antioch in 1212.

Pope Innocent, who had proclaimed a new crusade in 1213, wanted to persuade Leo to assist the crusaders. In that year, Leo renounced all lands that he had seized from the Templars, but retained Bagras. John of Brienne married Leo's daughter, Stephanie, in 1214. During the same period, Bohemond's position weakened. His attempt to take vengeance on the Assassins for the murder of his eldest son, Raymond, brought him into conflict with his old ally, Az-Zahir Ghazi of Aleppo.

Raymond-Roupen in Antioch 

With Leo's support, Raymond-Roupen began to find new allies, promising land grants to the Hospitallers and Antiochene noblemen, including Acharie of Sermin, the head of the commune of the burghers. Taking advantage of the absence of BohemondIV, Leo and his army entered Antioch during the night of 14February 1216. A few days later, the Templars, who had held the citadel, also surrendered without a struggle. The Latin Patriarch of Antioch, Peter of Ivrea, consecrated Raymond-Roupen prince. After his protégé seized the Principality of Antioch, Leo restored Bagras to the Knights Templar. During Leo's absence, KaykausI captured the Armenian forts to the north of the Taurus Mountains, forcing him to concentrate on the defense of Cilicia.

After finding an empty treasure in Antioch, Raymond-Roupen increased taxation, which made him unpopular among his subjects. In 1217, Raymond-Roupen tried to capture Leo, but the Templars assisted Leo to flee to Cilicia. Bohemond visited John, King of Jerusalem, in Acre in autumn 1217. Early the next year, John recognized Bohemond as the lawful prince, but did not provide him with military assistance. The burghers and noblemen of Antioch rose up against Raymond-Roupen. Their leader, William Farabel, persuaded Bohemond to come back to the town. After Bohemond's arrival, Raymond-Roupen at first sought refuge in the citadel but soon fled to Cilicia, granting the citadel to the Hospitallers. Raymond-Roupen could never regain Antioch.

Aftermath 

Leo was dying when Raymond-Roupen came to Cilicia. With Leo's death in May 1219 and Bohemond's restoration, the war "came to a rather unspectacular end". Leo disinherited Raymond-Roupen and willed Cilicia to his five-year-old daughter, Isabella. Both Raymond-Roupen (the grandson of Leo's elder brother, Rupen) and John, King of Jerusalem (the husband of Leo's elder daughter, Stephanie) refused to accept Leo's last will, claiming Cilicia for themselves. The new conflict lasted for decades, further weakening the Christian states of Northern Syria.

See also 

Crusades
Eastern Catholic Churches

References

Sources 

 
 
 
 
 

Military history of the Armenian Kingdom of Cilicia
Principality of Antioch
Antiochia
1200s conflicts
1210s conflicts
1200s in Asia
1210s in Asia
Wars involving the Kingdom of Jerusalem
Wars involving the Knights Hospitaller
Wars involving the Sultanate of Rum
Wars involving the Knights Templar
13th century in the Crusader states